Benjamin Bouchouari (born 13 November 2001) is a Moroccan professional footballer who plays as a midfielder for  club Saint-Étienne. Born in Belgium, he is a youth international for Morocco.

Club career

Early life and youth career 
Born in Borgerhout, Belgium, Benjamin began his career from the youth division of Fortuna Sittard and was a part of their under-19 setup. He then joined the youth division of Roda JC and was a part of their under-19 and under-21 squads.

Roda JC 
Benjamin signed his first senior contract with Dutch and current Eerste Divisie club Roda JC on 2020. He would represent for the club in 2020–21 Eerste Divisie. Benjamin played his maiden appearance for the club in the KNVB Cup match against Fortuna Sittard on 28 October 2020 as a substitute for Patrick Pflücke in the 77th minute of the match. The match ended 0–2 to Fortuna Sittard. Benjamin made his debut league appearance against Jong FC Utrecht on 9 November 2020. Benjamin started as a substitute in the 81st minute of the game for Patrick Pflücke. The match ended 2–0 with Roda JC losing the match. Benjamin scored his debut goal for the club against Excelsior on 15 February 2021 in the 83rd minute of the game, which they won 1-3.

Saint-Étienne
On 16 August 2022, Bouchouari signed a three-year contract with Saint-Étienne in France.

International career
Born in Belgium, Benjamin is of Moroccan descent. He opted to represent the Morocco U23s in 2021.

Career statistics

References

External links 

 Benjamin Bouchouari at Roda JC Kerkrade
 
 Benjamin Bouchouari at Football Critic

2001 births
Living people
People from Borgerhout
Moroccan footballers
Morocco youth international footballers
Belgian footballers
Belgian sportspeople of Moroccan descent
Association football midfielders
Fortuna Sittard players
Roda JC Kerkrade players
AS Saint-Étienne players
Eerste Divisie players
Ligue 2 players
Moroccan expatriate footballers
Expatriate footballers in the Netherlands
Moroccan expatriate sportspeople in the Netherlands
Expatriate footballers in France
Moroccan expatriate sportspeople in France
Belgian expatriate footballers
Belgian expatriate sportspeople in the Netherlands
Belgian expatriate sportspeople in France